Young Woodley is a 1928 British silent drama film directed by Thomas Bentley and starring Marjorie Hume, Sam Livesey and Robin Irvine. The film was never released, and was subsequently remade by Bentley as a sound film Young Woodley in 1930. It was made at Cricklewood Studios. It was based on the play Young Woodley by John Van Druten.
This silent version was released to the home movie market running 8 x 200 ft reels, standard 8mm on Amber Stock.

Premise
The wife of a school headmaster becomes romantically involved with one of his pupils.

Cast
 Marjorie Hume as Laura Simmons
 Sam Livesey as Doctor Simmons
 Robin Irvine as Woodley
 Carl Harbord as Ainger
 Gerald Rawlinson as Vining
 John Cromer as Mr Woodley
 Tom Helmore as Milner
 Dorothy Black as Francesca

References

Bibliography
 Wood, Linda. British Films, 1927-1939. British Film Institute, 1986.

External links
 Programme notes from the 15th British Silent Film Festival

1928 films
1928 drama films
British drama films
1920s English-language films
British silent feature films
Films set in England
Films shot at Cricklewood Studios
Films directed by Thomas Bentley
Unreleased films
British films based on plays
British black-and-white films
1920s British films
Silent drama films